AeroEjecutiva is a small charter airline based at Comodoro Arturo Merino Benítez International Airport, Santiago, Chile.

Destinations

The only known route as of December 2006 was from Los Ángeles, Chile to Santiago, Chile.

Fleet
This small airline flies an Bae Jetstream 31

References

Airlines of Chile
Airlines established in 2005
Chilean companies established in 2005